Nouran Ahmed Gohar (born 30 September 1997 in Egypt) is a professional squash player who represents Egypt. She reached a career-high world ranking of No. 1 in July 2020.

Career
She lifted her first Tour title at the Prague Open in December 2013 at 16 years of age, where she played to her seeding to see off Lucie Fialová to triumph. Gohar earned another title the following year at the Irish Open before her victory over Omneya Abdel Kawy in the final of the Monte Carlo Classic elevated her into the world's top 20 for the first time. A quarter-final finish at the Texas Open in April 2015 ensured that Gohar would breach the top 15 in the world.

Nouran Gohar won the prestigious British Junior Open three times: in 2012, 2015, and 2016. She also was a two time World Junior Squash champion, winning two back to back titles in 2015 and 2016. In 2016, she was part of the Egyptian team that won the gold medal at the 2016 Women's World Team Squash Championships.

In 2018, she won her second world team title as part of the Egyptian team that won the 2018 Women's World Team Squash Championships.

During May 2019 Gohar defeated the French fourth seed Camille Serme in the final of the prestigious 2019 Women's British Open Squash Championship, which saw Gohar (seeded seventh) becoming the lowest seed to win the tournament in the modern era. It was a well deserved victory because she beat the number 1 and 3 seeds (Raneem El Weleily and Nour El Tayeb) on the way to the final. This helped propel her toward the number 1 ranking in the world which she achieved in July 2020.

In 2022, she was part of the Egyptian team that won the 2022 Women's World Team Squash Championships. It was her third world team title.

Major World Series final appearances

British Open: 3 finals (1 title, 2 runner-up)

Hong Kong Open: 1 final (1 title, 0 runner-up)

El Gouna International: 1 finals (0 title, 1 runner-up)

United States Open: 3 finals (3 titles, 0 runner-up)

See also 
 Official Women's Squash World Ranking

References

External links 
 
 
 

Egyptian female squash players
Living people
1997 births
Sportspeople from Cairo
21st-century Egyptian women